The 1920 United States presidential election in Washington took place on November 2, 1920, as part of the 1920 United States presidential election in which all 48 states participated. State voters chose seven electors to represent them in the Electoral College via a popular vote pitting Democratic nominee James M. Cox and his running mate, Assistant Secretary of the Navy Franklin Roosevelt, against Republican challenger U.S. Senator Warren G. Harding and his running mate, Governor Calvin Coolidge.

Background
By the beginning of 1920 skyrocketing inflation and President Woodrow Wilson's focus upon his proposed League of Nations at the expense of domestic policy had helped make the incumbent President very unpopular – besides which Wilson also had major health problems that had left First Lady Edith effectively running the nation.

Political unrest observed in the Palmer Raids and the "Red Scare" further added to the unpopularity of the Democratic Party, since this global political turmoil produced considerable fear of alien revolutionaries invading the country. Demand in the West for exclusion of Asian immigrants became even stronger than it had been before. Another issue was the anti-Cox position taken by the Ku Klux Klan because Cox was viewed by the Klan as too lenient towards Catholicism, and Cox's inconsistent stance on newly passed Prohibition – he had been a "wet" but announced he would support Prohibition enforcement in August

The West had been the chief presidential battleground ever since the "System of 1896" emerged following that election. For this reason, Cox chose to tour the entire nation and after touring the Pacific Northwest Cox went to California to defend his proposed League of Nations and to convince the region that large sums of money were being spent by Harding simply to put Republicans in the White House. Cox argued that the League could have stopped the Asian conflicts – like the Japanese seizure of Shandong – but his apparent defence of Chinese immigrants in the Bay Area was very unpopular and large numbers of hecklers attacked the Democrat. Moreover, the only attention Cox received in the Western press was severe criticism, and he completely ignored charges against misadministration by the Wilson Administration, and in liberal, heavily unionized Washington State where strikes had been particularly extreme since the war ended, Cox's failure to address labour issues proved also very costly.

Vote
By October, it was clear that the Northwest – where Charles Evans Hughes had carried only Oregon in 1916 – was strongly in favor of the Republicans: in Washington Harding led a combined poll of male and female voters 680 to Cox's 256. A week later polls strongly suggested Cox would not register a majority in any antebellum free or postbellum state, and in the Evergreen State he was trialing four to one out of around 2,100 people polled. Although there were some gains by the Democratic ticket in later polls, with Cox approaching a 1-to-2 ratio to Harding's support at the end of October, a minimum forty thousand vote plurality was predicted by the Washington Post at the same time.

Ultimately Harding took Washington in a landslide beyond the late-October polls' prediction, defeating Cox by a 138,839 vote margin. Parley Christensen, the nominee of the recently created Farmer-Labor Party, performed very well in the state and nearly drove Cox into third place, with only 7,052 votes between the two.

Harding proved the third and last Republican, following on from Theodore Roosevelt in 1904 and William Howard Taft in 1908, to sweep every county in Washington State. This feat has been equaled only by Democrat Franklin Delano Roosevelt, who ironically was Cox's running mate in this election, in both 1932 and 1936. This would prove the last election until Richard Nixon in 1968 when the Republican Party carried Ferry County.

Results

Results by county

See also
 United States presidential elections in Washington (state)

Notes

References

Washington
1920 Washington (state) elections
1920